Luise F. Pusch (born 14 January 1944 in  Gütersloh, Germany) is a German linguist.  She is regarded as the co-founder of feminist linguistics in Germany, along with Senta Trömel-Plötz.

Life and education 
Luise Pusch studied English, Latin and linguistics at the University of Hamburg. In 1972 she received her doctorate in English. In 1978, she qualified for the linguistics faculty at the University of Konstanz. From 1979 to 1984 she was a Heisenberg Fellow in the field of feminist linguistic research.  Before feminist linguistics became her specialty, she worked on syntactic issues such as construction of gerunds.  From 1982 to 1985 she held professorships in English and German in Leibniz University Hannover and in the University of Duisburg-Essen. In 1985, she was named adjunct professor at the University of Konstanz. In 1990-1991, she was professor for women's studies at the University of Münster. Since 1986, Pusch has been partnered with U.S. Germanist Joey Horsley from Boston, and splits her time between there and Hannover.

Career 
In the mid-1970s, U.S. feminists such as Robin Lakoff and others had begun to pay attention to the gender discrimination inherent in the language itself, and the way it was used.  Feminist linguistics didn't originally develop out of the academic linguistic discipline, but from theoreticians within oppressed groups.  From those beginnings, it was brought into the field of linguistics by two professors of linguistics, Senta Trömel-Plötz and Pusch who started the program of Feminist linguistics at the University of Konstanz.  The first essays to appear in Germany about the topic were in 1979 in the journal Osnabrücker Beiträge zur Sprachtheorie, and in 1980 in Linguistische Berichte.

Since the 1970s Pusch has been committed to a gender-appropriate language, for example in essays, commentary, discussions, lectures and workshops.

In her 1980 essay, "German as Men's Language: Diagnosis and Therapy Ideas" (Das Deutsche als Männersprache. Diagnose und Therapievorschläge) , she wrote that standard German has a built-in bias favoring males, that this is problematic, and that the simplest solution to the problem lies in partial de-genderization of the language.  To that end, the feminine suffixes -in and -innen could be done away with and (contrary to the existing usage of the language) the male article (der / ein) of the noun would be replaced by the female version (die / eine); female professors would become, simply, "die Professor" (instead of Professorin) or "eine Schriftsteller" (writer) instead of Schriftstellerin. 

Due to the expected non-acceptance of such a proposal, she pleaded for the stepped up use of Binnen-I (e.g., SchülerIn (schoolchild) ) in order to avoid use of the paired-word form, Schülerinnen und Schüler (schoolgirls and schoolboys).  Besides her linguistic work, she built a biographical database containing the biographies of 30,000 women.

In 1981 she wrote the autobiographical novel Sonja: eine Melancholie für Fortgeschrittene (″Sonja: Melancholia for Intermediates″) about her suicidal partner under the pseudonym Judith Offenbach.

Awards 
The association , a network of women in the book industry, chose Luise F. Pusch as "BookWoman of the Year" 2004. On her 70th Birthday, Pusch was honored with the commemorative Sprachwandlerin award. The Darmstadt-based Luise Büchner Society awarded Pusch their 5th Luise Büchner Prize for Media studies in November 2016.

Works 

 
 as publisher: 
 
 as publisher: 
 as publisher:  
 as publisher: 
 
 as publisher, with Sibylle Duda: 
 {{cite book |language=de |last1=Pusch |first1=Luise F. |author-mask=3 |title=Ladies first: ein Gespräch über Feminismus Sprache und Sexualität. |trans-title=Ladies First: A Conversation About Feminism, Language and Sexuality |publisher=Palette |location=Bamberg |date=1993a |isbn=3-928062-07-7 }}
 
 as publisher: 
 as publisher, with Sibylle Duda: 
 
 as publisher, with Sibylle Duda: 
 with  Susanne Gretter (pub.): 
 with Susanne Gretter (pub.): 
 
 
 with Joey Horsley: 
 
 
 
 

 See also 

 Feminist language reform
 Gender-neutral language
 Gender-neutral pronoun
 Gender neutrality in languages with grammatical gender
 Gender role in language
 German orthography
 German nouns
 Grammatical gender in German
 Language and gender
 Language and thought
 Lavender linguistics
 Sapir-Whorf hypothesis
 Women's studies

 Sources 

 
 
 
 
 

 References 

 Further reading 

 : Die Sprachwandlerin - Luise F. Pusch. Zurufe und Einwürfe von Freundinnen und Weggefährtinnen. Eine Femmage zum 70. Geburtstag von Luise F. Pusch. [The Language Translator - Luise F. Pusch. Calls and suggestions from girlfriends and companions . A femmage for the 70th birthday of Luise F. Pusch] Wallstein, Göttingen 2014, .
 , : Die Neue Frauenbewegung in Deutschland. Abschied vom kleinen Unterschied. [The New Women's Movement in Germany. Farewell to the Small Difference] VS Verlag für Sozialwissenschaften, Wiesbaden 2008, .
 Eva Rieger (pub.): Diese Frau ist der Rede wert: Festschrift für Luise Pusch. [This Woman Is Worth Mentioning: Festschrift for Luise Pusch] Centaurus, Herbolzheim 2004, .

Sources

External links 

 Press clippings about Luise F. Pusch (in German)
 Pusch's blog (in German)
 Chantal Louis: Luise Pusch: Die Frauensprachlerin. 2014 interview with Emma Pusch.

20th-century German women writers
21st-century German women writers
Linguists from Germany
Lesbian feminists
Lesbian academics
German feminists
German women academics
Academic staff of the University of Münster
Women linguists
1944 births
Living people